Corymbia candida, commonly known as the desert ghost gum or ghost gum, is a bloodwood native to arid parts of the Northern Territory and Western Australia.

Description
It has smooth, white and powdery bark that it sheds in thin strips. It forms a crown of oppositely arranged leaves. The leaves have cordate shaped blades that can rarely be lanceolate. It blooms around July and produces axillary compound inflorescences in groups of three buds per umbel.

Taxonomy
Corymbia candida was first formally described by Kenneth Hill and Lawrence Alexander Sidney Johnson in 1995 in the journal Telopea, from specimens collected near Giralia in 1983. Corymbia candida has a strong resemblance to C. aspera. The specific epithet is taken from the Latin word candidus meaning glossy white in reference to the starkly white trunk.

Distribution
It is distributed widely through the Pilbara and Goldfields-Esperance regions of Western Australia where it grows in breakaway areas and pebbly plains in clay, sand, loam or gravel red coloured soils. It is found as far west as Exmouth and has a scattered distribution extending eastwards through the Gascoyne River catchment to the headwaters and continuing into the Little Sandy Desert, Great Sandy Desert, Gibson Desert and into the Northern Territory and the Tanami Desert.

See also
 List of Corymbia species

References

candida
Myrtales of Australia
Flora of Western Australia
Flora of the Northern Territory
Plants described in 1995